The 1923–24 Idaho Vandals men's basketball team represented the University of Idaho during the  NCAA college basketball season. Members of the Pacific Coast Conference, the Vandals were led by fourth-year head coach  and played their home games on campus at the Armory and Gymnasium in Moscow, Idaho.

References

External links
Sports Reference – Idaho Vandals: 1923–24 basketball season
Gem of the Mountains: 1924 University of Idaho yearbook – 1923–24 basketball season
Idaho Argonaut – student newspaper – 1924 editions

Idaho Vandals men's basketball seasons
Idaho
Idaho
Idaho